This article lists the results of the Scotland women's national football team from 2000 to 2009. The list excludes unofficial matches, where the opposition did not have full international status or it was played behind closed doors. For example, Scotland played the Isle of Man in the Celt Cup and a United States under-18 team in the 2000 Albena Cup.

2000

2001

2002

2003

2004

2005

2006

2007

2008

2009

See also
Scotland women's national football team 1972–99 results
Scotland women's national football team 2010–19 results
Scotland women's national football team 2020–29 results

References

External links
Women's A Squad Results
Scotland women's national team results summary at worldfootball

2000
1999–2000 in Scottish football
2000–01 in Scottish football
2001–02 in Scottish football
2002–03 in Scottish football
2003–04 in Scottish football
2004–05 in Scottish football
2005–06 in Scottish football
2006–07 in Scottish football
2007–08 in Scottish football
2008–09 in Scottish women's football
2009 in Scottish women's football
2010 in Scottish women's football